The 1970 United States Senate election in Arizona took place on November 3, 1970. Incumbent Republican U.S. Senator Paul Fannin decided to run for reelection to a second term, running unopposed in the Republican primary. Fannin defeated Democratic nominee Sam Grossman in the general election. This would be the last time until the Republican Revolution of 1994 that Republicans would win Arizona's Class 1 Senate Seat.

Republican primary

Candidates
 Paul Fannin, incumbent U.S. Senator

Democratic primary

Candidates
 Sam Grossman, businessman
 John Kruglick, doctor
 H. L. Kelly

Results

General election

See also 
 United States Senate elections, 1970

References

1970
Arizona
United States Senate